Agylla umbrosa is a moth of the family Erebidae. It was described by Paul Dognin in 1894. It is found in Ecuador.

References

Moths described in 1894
umbrosa
Moths of South America